Bégbessou is a town in central Ivory Coast. It is a sub-prefecture of Bouaflé Department in Marahoué Region, Sassandra-Marahoué District. The town is approximately five kilometres away from Lake Kossou.

Bégbessou was a commune until March 2012, when it became one of 1126 communes nationwide that were abolished.

In 2014, the population of the sub-prefecture of Bégbessou was 19,787.

Villages
The 11 villages of the sub-prefecture of Bégbessou and their population in 2014 are:

Notes

Sub-prefectures of Marahoué
Former communes of Ivory Coast